Brady John Raggio (born September 17, 1972) is a former Major League Baseball and Nippon Professional Baseball pitcher who played for three seasons. From  until , he pitched for the Fukuoka Daiei Hawks.

In 2016, Brady joined the PGA TOUR's Barracuda Championship as their Director of Sales.

References

External links

1972 births
Living people
American expatriate baseball players in Japan
American expatriate baseball players in Mexico
Arizona Diamondbacks players
Arizona League Cardinals players
Arkansas Travelers players
Baseball players from Los Angeles
Bridgeport Bluefish players
Chabot Gladiators baseball players
Fukuoka Daiei Hawks players
Louisville Redbirds players
Madison Hatters players
Major League Baseball pitchers
Memphis Redbirds players
Mexican League baseball pitchers
New Jersey Cardinals players
Nippon Professional Baseball pitchers
Oklahoma RedHawks players
Peoria Chiefs players
Piratas de Campeche players
Reading Phillies players
St. Louis Cardinals players
St. Petersburg Cardinals players
Tucson Sidewinders players